Hoa Lac Hi-tech Park is the first and largest hi-tech park in Vietnam with total area of 1586 ha (app. 4000 acres). Located in the area of Hanoi Capital, Hoa Lac Hi-tech Park was developed as a model of science city with over 200,000 people working, living and consists of the following main functional zones:
 Research and Development Zone (R&D) has area of 229 ha, surrounds the Software Park. It is a location for national institutes, labs on hi-tech development and application.
 Software Park has total area of 76 ha, located in peninsula area and surrounded by Tan Xa lake. This Park is for businesses in software development and trading.
Currently, there are two software companies located including FPT Software and Viettel Software. They are two biggest software companies of Vietnam.
 Hi-tech Industrial Zone has area of 549, 5 ha, located in the South of Hoa Lac Hi-tech park. It is a place for manufacturing factories, customs clearance, bonded warehouse, etc.
 Education and Training Zone has area of 108 ha, located in the North of hi-tech park near National Road No 21.
 Central Area has area of 50 ha, located near Software Park. This is for public service facilities such as office building, conference center, post office, hotel and restaurant, etc.
 Service area has area of 87,5 ha. It is multifunction service that includes trading, business, supermarket, restaurant, hotel, and public health.

See also
 Saigon Hi-Tech Park
 Danang Hi-tech Park

References
 Official site

Science parks in Vietnam